Gladiolus equitans is a Gladiolus species found in the rocky hills in Namaqualand, South Africa.

References

External links

equitans